NGC 5579 is an intermediate spiral galaxy in the constellation Boötes.

References

External links
 
 Image NGC 5579
 http://seds.org/
 Distance

Boötes
5579
09180
51236
069
Intermediate spiral galaxies